Amoeba (sometimes amœba or ameba, plural amoebae, amoebas or amebas) is a type of cell or organism which has the ability to alter its shape, primarily by extending and retracting pseudopods.

Amoeba or variants may also refer to:

Biology
 Amoeba (genus), a genus of single-celled protists in the family Amoebidae
 Amoebozoa, a large group of protists that includes the genus Amoeba

Arts and entertainment
 Amoeba Music, an independent music chain
 Amoeba (band), an experimental music group with Robert Rich and Rick Davies
 Amoeba (album), a 1991 album by the band Critters Buggin
 "Amoeba" (song), a 1981 song by the Adolescents
 Amoeba (film), a 2016 Malayalam film

Other uses
 Ameba (website), a Japanese social networking website
 Amoeba (mathematics), a certain type of set
 Amoeba order, a mathematical construction in set theory
 Amoeba (operating system)
 Amoeba defense, a basketball strategy
 Amoeba method, a type of downhill search algorithm for finding minima (optima)
 Amoeba Management,  a management system designed by Kyocera founder Kazuo Inamori